Caren Lissner is an American novelist, essayist, and newspaper editor. Her published novels include Carrie Pilby (2003) and Starting from Square Two (2004).

Early life 
Caren Lissner was born on February 13, 1973, in Elizabeth, New Jersey. She grew up in Freehold Township, New Jersey, and attended Laura Donovan School and Barkalow Middle School. She graduated from Cedar Ridge High School in Old Bridge Township, New Jersey. She holds a BA in English from the University of Pennsylvania, which she attended from 1989 to 1993. While there, she wrote for the student newspaper, the Daily Pennsylvanian, and was a member of the Philomathean Society.

Career 
Lissner has published essays, articles, and satire in The New York Times, The Philadelphia Inquirer, The Atlantic, and McSweeney's Internet Tendency. She is editor-in-chief of the Hudson Reporter group of newspapers based in Hudson County, New Jersey. Her novel Carrie Pilby was re-released July 1, 2010, by Harlequin Teen and was made into an independent film of the same name starring Bel Powley and Nathan Lane. The film debuted in theaters in March 2017, and was released to Netflix in September 2017.

References

External links
 

1973 births
21st-century American novelists
American chick lit writers
American women essayists
American women novelists
Novelists from New Jersey
The Daily Pennsylvanian people
Living people
Old Bridge High School alumni
People from Freehold Township, New Jersey
People from Old Bridge Township, New Jersey
University of Pennsylvania alumni
21st-century American women writers